| full_name       = 
| nickname        = 
| country         = 
| formercountry   = 
| birth_date      = 
| birth_place     = Kansas City, Missouri
| residence       = Norman, Oklahoma
| death_date      = 
| death_place     = 
| height          = 5 ft 3 in
| weight          = 
| website         = 
| discipline      = WAG
| level           = Senior International Elite
| natlteam        = 2011–2017 (USA)
| club            = Great American Gymnastics Express (GAGE)
| gym             = 
| collegeteam     = Oklahoma Sooners(2015–19)
| headcoach       = Al Fong
| assistcoach     = 
| formercoach     = 
| choreographer   = 
| music           = 
| eponymousskills = The Dowell (FX) Piked Double Front salto
| retired         = April 25, 2019
| show-medals     = yes
| medaltemplates  = 

}}

Brenna Dowell (born March 4, 1996) is a former American artistic gymnast. She was a member of the gold medal-winning U.S. team at the 2015 World Artistic Gymnastics Championships. A prevalent gymnast on the National scene throughout the 2010s, Dowell has combined elite and collegiate gymnastics; she deferred her sophomore season with the Oklahoma Sooners in order to make a bid for the 2016 Summer Olympics team.

Personal life
Dowell was born in Kansas City, Missouri, in 1996 to Michael and Carole Dowell. Dowell began gymnastics in 1997 after her mother enrolled her in a flip flop class. Dowell has three sisters, Carey, Jacey and Lauren. During her club career she was a student at Odessa (MO) High School. Dowell graduated in 2014. In fall of 2014, she began studies at the University of Oklahoma, where she competes with the university's NCAA gymnastics team. Before her college gymnastics experience she was coached by Al Fong and Armine Barutyan and trained at the Great American Gymnastics Express.

Junior career

2009 
Dowell started her elite junior in 2009. At the 2009 CoverGirl Classic, Dowell finished 13th in the All Around and 8th on Vault. At the Visa Championships, Dowell finished 19th in the All Around.

2010 
Dowell continued her elite junior career in 2010. At the 2010 Visa Championships, Dowell finished fourth on uneven bars.

2011 
In 2011, Dowell competed at the CoverGirl Classic and was fifth all-around, third on vault, and fifth on uneven bars. At the Visa Championships, Dowell was sixth all-around, fifth on vault, sixth on uneven bars, and eighth on floor exercise.

Senior career

2012 
Dowell started her senior career in 2012. In March at the City of Jesolo Trophy in Jesolo, Italy, Dowell finished seventh all-around, second on uneven bars, and eighth on vault.

In June at the Visa Championships, Dowell was ninth all-around. Following the Visa Championships Dowell was invited to compete at the 2012 US Olympic Trials.

In July Dowell competed at the U.S. Olympic Trials. At Trials Dowell was ninth all-around and eighth on uneven bars. Dowell was not named to the 2012 Olympic Team.

In October Dowell competed at the Mexican Open in Acapulco, Mexico. Dowell won the all-around title with a score of 57.100. Dowell also had the top score on vault, uneven bars and floor exercise.

2013 
In April Dowell competed at the 2013 City of Jesolo Trophy. Dowell finished third all-around, third on uneven bars, and first with the team.

At the Secret U.S. Classic in July, Dowell was third all-around, fourth on floor exercise, and sixth on uneven bars.

At the P&G Championships, she was third all-around, third on uneven bars, and fifth on floor exercise.
Following the Championships, Dowell was selected to represent the United States at the 2013 World Artistic Gymnastics Championships.

In October, Dowell travelled to the World Championships in Antwerp, Belgium with Team USA. Dowell was selected and was intending to be a balance beam and uneven bars specialist. However, Dowell did not compete. Dowell was demoted to team alternate after teammate and 2012 Olympic Gold medalist, McKayla Maroney was selected to compete as an All-Around competitor. According to FIG rules, each country may only have 3 competitors on each apparatus. Following the World Championships, Dowell declined invitations to attend the Mexican Open in Acapulco, Mexico and two other World Cup events.

2014 

In February 2014, Dowell was selected as a last minute replacement for World Champion Simone Biles to compete in the 2014 American Cup. Dowell competed alongside teammate Elizabeth Price, who was also chosen as a replacement for the event following the withdrawal of 2012 Olympic Gold medalist Kyla Ross due to injury. Dowell placed second, winning the silver medal behind Price.

Dowell competed on uneven bars only at the 2014 Secret U.S. Classic in Chicago, Illinois. She scored 11.200, placing 14th on that event and 16th overall.

Dowell was selected as the non-traveling alternate for the 2014 World Championships.

2015 

University of Oklahoma

In January 2015, Dowell began competing with the University of Oklahoma gymnastics team.

Dowell had a stand-out first season at Oklahoma and found action for the Sooners on VT, UB and FX during the regular season. She scored season highs of 9.925 (VT), 10.00 (UB) and 9.975 (FX). She helped her team come in third place at Super Six Finals. She was Floor champion at the Big-12 Championships and was later crowned Big-12 Newcomer of the Year.

On June 9, 2015, it was announced that Dowell would be deferring for the 2015–16 season to compete elite again.

Secret U.S. Classic

On July 25, Dowell competed at the Secret U.S. Classic where she only competed on uneven bars and balance beam. On bars, she included her Tweddle release in combination with a half turn transfer (Ezhova). She fell on her toe-on Shaposhnikova (Maloney) and dismounted with a full-twisting double layout. Despite the fall, she scored a 14.350 and finished 8th on the event. A mistake and fall on beam scored an 11.800 and she finished 18th on the event.

P&G Championships

On August 13 & 15, Dowell competed at the P&G Championships where she competed in the all-around for the first time since 2013. She finished in 11th with a 2-night score of 113.700, including a 15.150 on uneven bars. She was named to the Senior National Team and was invited to the 2015 Worlds Selection Camp in September.

World Championships

On October 8, Dowell, alongside Simone Biles, Gabby Douglas, Madison Kocian, Maggie Nichols, Aly Raisman, and Mykayla Skinner, was once again chosen to represent the United States of America at the 2015 World Artistic Gymnastics Championships, in Glasgow. She competed floor, vault, and bars in team qualification. During her floor performance in qualifications her music did not play. She still competed a solid routine without music, and went along with the clapping from the audience. On floor, she performed a piked double front salto. This was the first time the skill had been performed at the World Championships, and thus it was named after her in the Code of Points. She performed a solid vault afterward.  She also competed on the uneven bars.  Dowell later became a world champion, winning gold with the team.

2016 

In early 2016, Brenna attended the U.S Olympic Team Summit, an event for potential U.S Olympic Team members to meet with the media and do promotional work. She attended with fellow 2015 World Championships gold medalists, Simone Biles, Aly Raisman. Gabby Douglas, Madison Kocian, Maggie Nichols and MyKayla Skinner.

In April, Dowell was chosen to compete at the 2016 Pacific Rim Gymnastics Championships in Everett, Washington. On day 1 of competition, Brenna had a clean competition, hitting all 4 of her events which helped team USA take the gold medal. She also took 4th place All-Around with a score of 58.850, making a strong case to earn one of the 5 spots on the 2016 U.S Olympic Team, coming back strong after having a bad experience at the 2015 World Championships, where she struggled with nerves despite earning a gold medal with team USA. Dowell, whilst having the 4th highest score at the Pacific Rim Championships, did not officially earn the 4th place spot due to the two per country rule. Officially, Shallon Olsen of Canada earned that spot, however it will be noted by the selection committee for the 2016 U.S Olympic team that she did indeed earn the fourth highest score behind U.S teammates, Aly Raisman, Simone Biles and Laurie Hernandez.

Dowell also qualified in second place to the Uneven Bars final, after displaying an impressive set on night 1 of competition. Also, after Simone Biles, was withdrawn from event finals, Dowell also earned a spot in the Floor Exercise final. In event finals, unfortunately, Dowell fell on a release move in the Uneven Bars final, incurring a deduction and placing her 5th with a score of 14.000. However, she came back strong and earned a silver medal in Floor Exercise finals with a score of 14.825 behind reigning Olympic Floor Exercise champion and U.S teammate, Aly Raisman.

At the 2016 P&G championships, Dowell was named to the National Team and earned a berth to the 2016 Olympic Trials in San Jose, CA. Despite solid efforts, she didn't make the main or alternate teams

2017 
In 2017, Dowell continued her gymnastics career at the University of Oklahoma for her Sophomore season.

Eponymous skill
Dowell has one eponymous skill listed in the Code of Points.

References

External links
 
 

1996 births
Living people
American female artistic gymnasts
Sportspeople from Kansas City, Missouri
Oklahoma Sooners women's gymnasts
Medalists at the World Artistic Gymnastics Championships
Originators of elements in artistic gymnastics
U.S. women's national team gymnasts
NCAA gymnasts who have scored a perfect 10
21st-century American women